Hoveyzeh is an Iranian ultra-light armored personnel carrier which was unveiled in August 2012. This vehicle has the capability to carry weapons and diverse equipment; and is capable to operate at night by having ability to be used quickly and easily, appropriate speed, effective camouflage and facile-hiding. Among other features of "Hovezyeh armored-vehicle" are: feasibility of easy transportation, possibility of air transportation by plane/helicopter, usability in different missions of the Armed Forces, and so on.

Hoveyzeh armored vehicle has the capability to be utilized at border-checkpoints in order to fight criminals and fight against drug-trafficking as well as other military and law enforcement operations. Hoveyzeh is used in civilian affairs, too; such as being utilized in unforeseen events, etc. According to Tasnim-News: presumably, the Hoveyzeh can carry four passengers as well as the driver, and a periscope has been installed for each passenger in order to allow outside visibility.

See also
Military of Iran
Iranian military industry
Equipment of the Iranian army
Tanks of Iran

References

Armoured fighting vehicles of Iran
Tracked armoured personnel carriers
Military vehicles introduced in the 2010s